Victor Raider-Wexler is an American film and television actor, best known for roles as Stan in the sitcom Everybody Loves Raymond (1996–2004), the dual roles of Mr. Kaplan and Mr. Kaufman in the sitcom The King of Queens (2001–2007), Igor in the 2000 family comedy film The Adventures of Rocky and Bullwinkle (2000) and Judge B. Duff in Dr. Dolittle 2 (2001).

His voice roles in animation and video games include Tonoyama in Burn-Up Excess, Asimov in Geneshaft, Ray in American Dad!, Dr. Gennadi Volodnikov in Indiana Jones and the Infernal Machine, Vendel in Tales of Arcadia and Fredric Estes in The Boss Baby: Back in Business.

Career
Raider-Wexler started his career in the 1970s. He was the stage manager for the 1976 Broadway play Best Friend. In the 1980s, Wexler began acting in episodes of series such as Kate & Allie and Crime Story. However, Wexler's career really catapulted in the 1990s with around 45 credits in the decade. Wexler appeared in The Wonder Years, Friends, Murder One, ER, Married... with Children, Alright Already, Dharma & Greg, Everybody Loves Raymond, House M.D., Without a Trace, and The War at Home. Perhaps because of his stern and low voice, Wexler often plays the role of a lawyer, judge or a doctor. Evidence of this are his appearances in A Friend to Die For, Murder One, Friends, Living Single, Buddy Faro, The Michael Richards Show, Three Sisters, Judging Amy, Sabrina, the Teenage Witch, The King of Queens, NYPD Blue, Boston Legal, and Seinfeld.  He voiced the troll leader Vendel in the acclaimed Netflix original series Trollhunters. He also voiced Frederic Estes in Season 2 of the Netflix original series The Boss Baby: Back in Business.

Wexler also starred as "Hershel of Ostropol" in the play "Hershel and the Hanukkah Goblins" at the Jewish Community Center of Greater Kansas City.

He played the role of Marley in the 2016 Christmas play A Christmas Carol at the Kansas City Repertory Theatre.

Personal life
Raider-Wexler is a devout Jew.

Filmography

Film

Television

Video games

References

External links

American male film actors
American male television actors
American male voice actors
20th-century American male actors
21st-century American male actors
Jewish American male actors
Living people
21st-century American Jews
Year of birth missing (living people)